Following is a list of all Article III United States federal judges appointed by President George H. W. Bush during his presidency. All information is derived from the Biographical Directory of Federal Judges, a public-domain publication of the Federal Judicial Center. In total Bush appointed 193 Article III federal judges, including two Justices to the Supreme Court of the United States, 42 judges to the United States Courts of Appeals, 148 judges to the United States district courts and one judge to the United States Court of International Trade.

Additionally, eight Article I federal judicial appointments are listed, six to the United States Court of Appeals for Veterans Claims and two to the United States Court of Federal Claims. Other Article I appointments by President Bush are not listed.

Eleven of Bush’s appointees remain in active service in the roles to which Bush appointed them: Supreme Court Justice Clarence Thomas, five appeals court judges and five district court judges. One district judge and one appellate judge remain in active service on the Supreme Court by appointment of later presidents.

United States Supreme Court justices

Courts of appeals

District courts

United States Court of International Trade

Specialty courts (Article I)

United States Court of Federal Claims

United States Court of Appeals for Veterans Claims

Notes

Renominations

References
General

 

Specific

Sources
 Federal Judicial Center

Judicial appointments
Bush, George H. W.

George H. W. Bush-related lists